Kilmarnock North  is one of the nine electoral wards of East Ayrshire Council. Created in 2007, the ward elects three councillors using the single transferable vote electoral system and covers an area with a population of 12,243 people.

The area is a Scottish National Party (SNP) stronghold with the party holding two of the three seats at all but one election since the ward's creation.

Boundaries
The ward was created following the Fourth Statutory Reviews of Electoral Arrangements ahead of the 2007 Scottish local elections. As a result of the Local Governance (Scotland) Act 2004, local elections in Scotland would use the single transferable vote electoral system from 2007 onwards so Kilmarnock North was formed from an amalgamation of several previous first-past-the-post wards. It contained all of the former Onthank ward as well as parts of the former Kilmaurs and Stewarton South, North Kilmarnock, Fenwick and Waterside, Altonhill, Hillhead and Longpark and North New Farm Loch and Dean wards. Initially, Kilmarnock North included the northernmost part of Kilmarnock including the neighbourhoods of Onthank, Altonhill, Hillhead, Longpark and Southcraigs as well as Dean Castle Country Park. Following the Fifth Statutory Reviews of Electoral Arrangements ahead of the 2017 Scottish local elections, the ward's eastern boundary was moved west to run along the B7038 instead of the Kilmarnock Water and Craufurdland Water. As a result, Dean Castle Country Park is now contained within the Kilmarnock East and Hurlford ward.

Councillors

Election results

2022 election

2017 election

2014 by-election

2012 election

2007 election

Notes

References

Wards of East Ayrshire
Politics of Kilmarnock